Lovech Municipality is a municipality (obshtina) in Lovech Province, Central-North Bulgaria, located on the border between the area of the Fore-Balkan and the Danubian Plain. It is named after its administrative centre - the city of Lovech which is also the capital of the province.

The area is known with the covered bridge by Kolyu Ficheto, in the main town, and the spectacular Devetaki cave near to the homonymous village.

Settlements 

Lovech Municipality includes the following 35 places (towns are shown in bold):

Demography 
The following table shows the change of the population during the last four decades. Since 1992 Lovech Municipality has comprised the former municipality of Aleksandrovo and the numbers in the table reflect this unification.

Religion
According to the latest Bulgarian census of 2011, the religious composition, among those who answered the optional question on religious identification, was the following:

See also
Provinces of Bulgaria
Municipalities of Bulgaria
List of cities and towns in Bulgaria

References

External links
 Official website 

Municipalities in Lovech Province